"Baby Girl, I'm a Blur" is the first single from Say Anything's album, In Defense of the Genre. It was released on iTunes on October 2, 2007. The song impacted radio on November 6. This song was written in Central Park by Max Bemis. He was quoted as saying

A video for the song was released on November 12, 2007.

The song was used in the fourth episode of the American television series Breaking Bad entitled "Cancer Man".

Video
The music video for "Baby Girl, I'm a Blur" is essentially a performance video. It features the band performing the song in a black room in front of a wall of square infrared images. Shots of the band alternate between infrared shots of a couple. As the song progresses, the band starts to smash their instruments.

The video was an "Unleashed" video on MTV2. It was premiered on November 12, 2007, and was directed by Wayne Isham. The video was also premiered on mtvU the same day. The song was recently #1 on the MTV countdown, Elite 8.

Chart positions

References

External links
Video for "Baby Girl, I'm a Blur"

2007 singles
Say Anything (band) songs
Songs written by Max Bemis
Music videos directed by Wayne Isham
2007 songs
J Records singles